Sir Colman Michael O'Loghlen, 2nd Baronet (pronounced and sometimes spelt O'Lochlen) (20 September 1819 – 22 July 1877) was an Irish baronet and politician.

O'Loghlen was born in County Clare, Ireland, eldest son of the distinguished Irish judge Sir Michael O'Loghlen, 1st Baronet and his wife Bidelia Kelly.

He was educated by the Jesuits at Clongowes Wood College, Co Kildare, attending from 1831 to 1833. He graduated from Dublin University in 1840 and was called to the Irish Bar later that year.

He succeeded to his baronetcy in 1842 on the death of his father, and in 1863 was elected to the British House of Commons for County Clare, holding the seat until his death. From 1868 until 1870 he also held the office of Judge Advocate General, which at the time was a political office.

He was elected a Member of the Royal Irish Academy in 1856.

He died in 1877, aged 57. He had no son and the title passed to his brother Bryan O'Loghlen, Premier of Victoria.

References

External links 
 

1819 births
1877 deaths
Members of the Middle Temple
Ologhlen, Sir Colman, 2nd Baronet
Members of the Parliament of the United Kingdom for County Clare constituencies (1801–1922)
Politicians from County Clare
UK MPs 1859–1865
UK MPs 1865–1868
UK MPs 1868–1874
UK MPs 1874–1880
19th-century Irish people
Members of the Royal Irish Academy
Members of the Privy Council of the United Kingdom
Serjeants-at-law (Ireland)